Taborovskiy Peak is the highest peak, at 2,895 m, in the Skarshaugane Peaks of the Betekhtin Range, Humboldt Mountains, in Queen Maud Land. It was discovered and plotted from air photos by German Antarctic Expedition, 1938–39. The peak was mapped from air photos and surveys by Norwegian Antarctic Expedition, 1956–60; remapped by Soviet Antarctic Expedition, 1960–61, and named after Soviet meteorologist N.L. Taborovskiy.

Humboldt Mountains (Antarctica)
Mountains of Queen Maud Land